Rodia (Greek: Ροδιά) is a town in the municipal unit of Diakopto, Achaea, Greece. It is located in the coastal plains near the Gulf of Corinth, 4 km northwest of Diakopto and 8 km southeast of Aigio. Rodia has a football/soccer team known as Floga (Φλόγα meaning flame) and it has a communal soccer field.

Population

External links 
 Rodia on GTP Travel Pages
 Rodia in www.ediakopto.gr

See also 

List of settlements in Achaea

References

Aigialeia
Diakopto
Populated places in Achaea